The Humane Society of the Commonwealth of Massachusetts, better known as the Massachusetts Humane Society was founded in 1786 by a group of Boston citizens who were concerned about the needless deaths resulting from shipwrecks and drownings and wanted to find ways to save lives.  It was based on the Royal Humane Society, a similar organization established in Great Britain in 1774. The Massachusetts Humane Society became the model for the United States Life-Saving Service funded by Congress in 1848 and operated by the United States Coast Guard since 1915.

Its first lifesaving activities consisted of publishing procedures for dealing with victims of shipwreck and other water-related accidents, and the placement of lifesaving equipment, lifeboats, and shelters on the islands and coast of Massachusetts Bay.  It also offered rewards to individuals who successfully rescued people from the state's waters.  By the early 20th century the society operated more than 50 support stations along the state's coast, and provided all manner of equipment for the use of rescuers.

In the 1810s the society was a major funding source for the establishment of Massachusetts General Hospital and an "Asylum for the Insane" which included what is now known as McLean Hospital.

The organization's current focus continues to be on water-based lifesaving activities and general medical facilities. It still gives awards for rescues, and funds other organizations engaged in lifesaving activities.

Bibliography
 James W. Claflin: Lighthouses and Life Saving Along Cape Cod. Arcadia Publishin 2014, .

References

External links

Goss, George Edward. Life saving
 Finding aid for the Humane Society of Massachusetts records at the  Massachusetts Historical Society

Lifesaving in the United States
Organizations based in Massachusetts
1786 establishments in Massachusetts
Lifesaving organizations